John Frederick Griffiths (8 February 1926 – 27 July 2003) was a Professor of Meteorology (as well as of agricultural climatology, architectural climatology and numerous other fields) at Texas A&M University and with the Organization for Tropical Studies. He was the first Texas State Climatologist and served as President of the American Association of State Climatologists from 1984 to 1985. His work was printed in a variety of publications, and he was frequently interviewed for his expertise on natural disasters and climate change. Later in his career, he was a chief consultant to many United States agencies, including the World Meteorological Organization and the U.S. Agencies for International Development. As a reminder of Griffiths' achievements and an inspiration to future generations of meteorologists, Texas A&M offers a scholarship in his name.

Early life and education

Griffiths was born on February 8, 1926, in London, England. As a teenager, he survived the London Blitz during World War II. He studied at the London University, (Imperial, and King's Colleges), earning several degrees in mathematics, physics, meteorology, theology and statistics. Griffiths specialized in applied meteorology and climatology, and was known internationally as an expert on the connection between climate and agriculture.

Career

First positions

After graduation from the London University, Griffiths became a bioclimatologist in the British Overseas Scientific Civil Service. His first projects gave him the opportunity to visit Ethiopia, Somalia, Saudi Arabia and East Africa. From 1950 to 1956, he worked for the British Colonial Scientific Service with the Desert Locust Survey.

From 1956 – 1958, he served as bioclimatologist with the East African Veterinary Research Organization. Then the East African Meteorological Department in Nairobi, Kenya, hired him as Principal Scientific Officer, and he managed its Research Section until 1962. Later in his career, Griffiths was asked to be the Hearne Rotary speaker on J.J. Yarka Vondracek's program to have a conversation on the history and the present of East Africa.

Texas A&M University (1960 – 1999)

In 1960, Griffiths won a Rockefeller and a Munitalp grant that allowed him to travel to and around the U.S. for the first time. He stayed at Texas A&M University for six or seven weeks, learning about the university and its culture. In 1962, Griffiths and his wife moved to College Station, Texas, where he became a Texas A&M Professor of Meteorology and helped develop an atmospheric sciences program that emerged as an international leader in the field. According to a university colleague, Professor David Woodcock, Griffiths "loved teaching, was very popular with his students and maintained an extraordinary connection with many of them."

Griffiths was the principal investigator for an A&M Research Foundation project to study the pollution over Houston in 1967. The data was used to improve a unique mathematical model that helps research gaseous materials by factoring in weather conditions, nature, materials and topography. The study continued into 1970 with the help of a Public Health Service grant.

As a professor, Griffiths also worked closely with U.S. and Latin American students in cooperation with the Organization for Tropical Studies, where he was Dean of the Meteorological Program. The program focused on locations in Central and South America. In 1969, Griffiths organized an eight semester-hour credit course that took place at the University of Costa Rica in Colombia to study atmospheric energy budgets.

In 1974 – 1975, Griffiths was chosen to be Texas A&M's University Lecturer. His topic was "The Climate is Changing." He was an early voice on the subject of climate change, climate warming, and how cities and fuel consumption impact long-term temperatures.

As an A&M professor, Griffiths taught ten different courses, including tropical meteorology, agricultural climatology, architectural climatology, and statistics. He supervised 67 masters’ theses and 13 doctoral dissertations. He retired from A&M in 1999 as a Professor Emeritus.

Activity as the Texas State Climatologist

In 1973, John Griffiths was named the first Texas State Climatologist and opened an office in the College of Geosciences. He was the only person to occupy the position since the federal government closed it 15 years prior. He spoke very highly of his position and its responsibilities: tracking the weather of the entire state of Texas, conveying it to people, and predicting what it would be like years and centuries ahead. Under Griffiths' command, the Office of Texas State Climatologist became known as a place anyone could visit or call to find out any climatological data for Texas.

During 1984 – 1985, Griffiths served as the President of the American Association of State Climatologists.

In an article published in 1988, Griffiths disagreed with fellow scientist James Hansen on the greenhouse effect as a cause for Earth's climate shift. Though skeptical about the greenhouse effect, Griffiths spoke out in support of limiting fossil fuel use, linking it to increased pollution in Texas. He actively debated climate warming, and the efficiency of models predicting such warming (such as the error in General Circulation Models of using single point estimates to represent large areas of the world, especially in Africa and South America).

In another article, Griffiths shared his knowledge and opinion on modern droughts in Texas. He studied 30 years of Texas climate records and claimed the worst drought took place in 1950.

Other activity, positions and honors

In 1963, Griffiths visited France to chair a group concerned with meteorological instrumentation. He presented two papers at the Third Congress of the International Society of Biometeorology in Pau, France.

In 1965, Griffiths was elected the chapter chairman of the American Meteorological Society's Texas local unit, defeating  his colleague Walter K. Henry.

During his career, Griffiths was a chief consultant to many United States agencies, including the World Meteorological Organization, the Food and Agriculture Organization, and the U.S. Agencies for International Development, which involved partnership with the governments of Greece, Spain, India, Kenya, Senegal, Mali and Mauritania. He worked as an affiliate with the National Climate Data Center in Asheville, N.C. as Principal Investigator, quality-controlling global climate databases.

Griffiths was named a Fellow of the Royal Meteorological, the Royal Geographical and the Royal Astronomical Societies, as well as Sigma Xi and Phil Kappa Phil. He was also a member of the World Academy of Art and Science.

Notable publications

Alongside his contributions to research and academia, Griffiths  published and edited, 12 books, authored more than 100 scientific articles, and edited selected issues of meteorological journals.

With the help of a former student and State Climatologist Office researchers, Griffiths authored a publication called "One Hundred Years of Texas Weather," which contained data, labels and maps to track Texas weather extremes.

In 2000, following the 100th anniversary of  the nation's deadliest hurricane in Galveston, Texas  Griffiths published an overview of local natural disasters and their consequences. He analyzed their causes and offered recommendations on how to prepare both the environment and the public for natural disasters.

Also, as a man of many interests and passions, Griffiths was a life-long member and historian for the Kent County Cricket Club. He published a number of volumes and special editions on the club's history.

Griffiths is perhaps best known for his 1966 book Applied Climatology, in which he introduced a new climate classification scheme, among its features being the use of 6 °C in the coldest month as the poleward limit of subtropical climates (this line following closely the poleward limit of where the hardiest palm trees can survive, and also the fact that 6 °C is the point colder than which photosynthesis becomes impossible), and placing dry climates — arid and semiarid — on the same thermal continuum as other climates, using a separate letter to denote these respective climates (F was used for all dry climates in the original scheme, but X and Z have been used to denote semiarid and arid climates, respectively, in the updated scheme).

The rules of the Griffiths scheme are as follows:

Temperature

A (tropical) climates: All 12 months with mean monthly temperatures of 18 °C or above

B (subtropical) climates: One or more months with mean monthly temperatures below 18 °C, but all 12 months with mean monthly temperatures of 6 °C or above

C (short winter) climates: 7 to 11 months with mean monthly temperatures of 6 °C or above

D (long winter) climates: 3 to 6 months with mean monthly temperatures of 6 °C° or above

E (tundra) climates: Less than 3 months with mean monthly temperatures of 6 °C or above, but at least one monthly mean above 0 °C.  While it is mathematically possible for the warmest month in this climate to average 10 °C or above, it is extremely rare for trees to be found therein, as per Otto Nordenskjöld's formula of W = 9 - 0.1C, with W denoting the warmest monthly mean temperature and C denoting the coldest monthly mean temperature, both in °C — the best examples can be found in locations along the Hudson Bay coast of Nunavut, which are treeless despite having a warmest month above 10 °C

F (ice cap) climates: All 12 months with mean monthly temperatures of 0 °C or below

Seasonality of Precipitation

"A" climates only

A1 (essentially analogous to Af under the Köppen climate classification scheme): 10 or more months with mean monthly precipitation of 50 mm or above (not 60 mm as in the Köppen scheme)

A2 (essentially analogous to Am in the Köppen scheme): 7–9 months with mean monthly precipitation of 50 mm or above

A3 (essentially analogous to Aw or As  in the Köppen scheme): 6 months or less with mean monthly precipitation of 50 mm or above, but not meeting the standards for designation as a semiarid or arid climate — the original formula for determining aridity was R = 160 + 0.9T, with R denoting mean annual precipitation in mm and T the mean annual temperature in °C; however, due to this formula's lack of differentiation between semiarid and arid climates, use of either the Köppen or the Trewartha scheme for fixing the aridity thresholds has become customary.

All other climates

U (uniform precipitation): The three consecutive wettest months do not receive twice as much precipitation as the three consecutive driest months

S (summer precipitation): The three consecutive wettest months receive more than twice as much precipitation as the three consecutive driest months, and the second of the three consecutive wettest months occurs in the high-sun season (April through September in the Northern Hemisphere, or October through March in the Southern Hemisphere).  This is seen most commonly in the monsoon regions of southern and eastern Asia, and in the landmass interiors of Asia and North America

W (winter precipitation — colloquially referred to as the Mediterranean climate, even though it can extend as far north as Provideniya, Russia: The three consecutive wettest months receive more than twice as much precipitation as the three consecutive driest months, and the second of the three consecutive wettest months occurs in the low-sun season (October through March in the Northern Hemisphere, or April through October in the Southern Hemisphere)

Under the original scheme, V for "vernal" (denoting spring maximum precipitation) and A for "autumn" (denoting autumn maximum precipitation) also existed, but these designations have largely fallen out of use.

Personal life

Working on an experimental atmospheric project in Kenya, Griffiths met his future wife, Margaret Joan Baron. In 1962, the couple got married in Londonand moved to College Station, Texas, where Griffiths became a Professor of Meteorology at Texas A&M University.

The Griffiths lived in College Station for over fifty years, during which they decided to become U.S. citizens. In spite of that, they never lost their British accent, manners, or values, such as serving high tea or celebrating Boxing Day. In the front garden of their house, Griffiths installed an imported English mail box that was nearly 100 years old.

Griffiths died of heart disease on July 27, 2003, in College Station, Texas. After his passing, Griffiths' wife, Joan, founded a scholarship endowment to honor him. To this day it supports many students with a passion for meteorology.

Extracurricular interests

From a young age, Griffiths had interest in live theater, concerts and films. Later, he started enjoying classical music and had an extensive library. He was an experienced collector, with collections of model trams, rare coins, stamps and more.

Griffiths' wife, Joan, shared her husband's interest in art, music and literature and was a President of TAMU Fine Arts Group.

Being fond of cricket, Griffiths helped Texas A&M found their first cricket team, was their captain and coach, elected several times, and was the president of the Texas A&M University Cricket Club. In 1966, under Griffiths' precise leadership, the team's first international match occurred; they went to Mexico City and beat Mexico City Sunday.

Awards

The London University awarded the Drew Gold Medal for Mathematics to Griffiths for distinguished student achievements.

In 1990, John Griffiths was given the Texas A&M’s Distinguished Achievement in Teaching Award.

See also 
 Texas A&M University
 College Station, Texas
 Organization for Tropical Studies
 Kent County Cricket Club
 Greenhouse effect
 Royal Meteorological Society

References

Literature cited

External links 
  Biography and legacy information

Texas A&M Aggies coaches
Scientists from London
Alumni of King's College London
Alumni of Imperial College London
British climatologists
Kent County Cricket Club
Royal Meteorological Society
Fellows of the Royal Geographical Society
Fellows of the Royal Astronomical Society